The Jamaican Chess Championship is the yearly national chess championship of Jamaica. The first edition was played in 1969. The championship is usually a twelve-player round-robin tournament. The championship is also used as a qualifier for the Chess Olympiads.

List of champions
{| class="sortable wikitable"
! Nr !! Year !! Winner
|-
|	1	||	1969	||	
|-
|	2	||	1970	||	
|-
|	3	||	1971	||	
|-
|	4	||	1972	||	
|-
|	5	||	1973	||	
|-
|	6	||	1974	||	
|-
|	7	||	1975	||	  
|-
|	8	||	1976	||	
|-
|	9	||	1977	||	
|-
|	10	||	1978	||	
|-
|	11	||	1979	||	  
|-
|	12	||	1980	||	
|-
|	13	||	1981	||	
|-
|	14	||	1982	||	
|-
|	15	||	1983	||	
|-
|	16	||	1984	||	
|-
|	17	||	1985	||	
|-
|	18	||	1986	||	
|-
|	19	||	1987	||	
|-
|	20	||	1988	||	
|-
|	21	||	1989	||	
|-
|	22	||	1990	||	
|-
|	23	||	1991	||	 	
|-
|	24	||	1992	||	  
|-
|	25	||	1993	||	
|-
|	26	||	1994	||	
|-
|	27	||	1995	||	  
|-
|	28	||	1996	||	
|-
|	29	||	1997	||	
|-
|	30	||	1998	||	
|-
|	31	||	1999	||	
|-
|	32	||	2000	||	
|-
|	33	||	2001	||	
|-
|	34	||	2002	||	
|-
|	35	||	2003	||	
|-
|	36	||	2004	||	
|-
|	37	||	2005	||	
|-
|	38	||	2006	||	
|-
|	39	||	2007	||	
|-
|	40	||	2008	||	
|-
|	40	||	2009	||	
|-
|	41	||	2010	||	
|-
|       43	||	2011	||	
|-
|       44	||	2012	||	  
|-
|       45      ||      2013    ||      
|-
|       46      ||      2014    ||      
|-
|       47      ||      2015    ||      
|-
|	48	||	2016	||	
|-
|}

Notes

Chess national championships
Championship
1969 in chess